Route 340 is a  long, mainly east/west secondary highway in the north-eastern portion of New Brunswick, Canada. 

The route's western terminus is in the community of Janeville. The road travels south-east to the community of Canobie. Passing the community, the highway takes a 90 degree turn south passing the community of Canobie South. The highway takes a 45 degree turn and travels to the community of Rocheville before taking another turn south then another turn east going towards Notre-Dame-des-Erables, Haut-Paquetville, and eventually Paquetville. There are no river crossings or intersecting routes.

See also
List of New Brunswick provincial highways

References

340
340